Ammotrechesta is a genus of ammotrechid camel spiders, first described by Carl Friedrich Roewer in 1934.

Species 
, the World Solifugae Catalog accepts the following five species:

 Ammotrechesta brunnea Roewer, 1934 — Costa Rica
 Ammotrechesta garcetei Armas, 1993 — Nicaragua
 Ammotrechesta maesi Armas, 1993 — Nicaragua
 Ammotrechesta schlueteri Roewer, 1934 — Honduras
 Ammotrechesta tuzi Armas, 2000 — Mexico

References 

Arachnid genera
Solifugae